Radovan Krstović (born 17 September 1963) is a Serbian retired footballer.

Career
He started his career out in his hometown club Radnički Nova Pazova after which he proceeded to play for Srem from Sremska Mitrovica. He became a full professional upon signing with Olimpija Ljubljana in 1983.

References

External links
 Profile at Football Database

1963 births
Living people
Association football midfielders
Yugoslav footballers
Serbian footballers
Serbian expatriate footballers
NK Olimpija Ljubljana (1945–2005) players
NK GOŠK Dubrovnik players
HNK Hajduk Split players
FK Željezničar Sarajevo players
Doxa Drama F.C. players
Olympiacos Volos F.C. players
Enosis Neon Paralimni FC players
Yugoslav First League players
Cypriot First Division players
Expatriate footballers in Austria
Expatriate footballers in Greece
Expatriate footballers in Cyprus